The 1977 Purdue Boilermakers football team represented Purdue University in the 1977 Big Ten Conference football season. Led by first-year head coach Jim Young, the Boilermakers compiled an overall record of 5–6 with a mark of 3–5 in conference play, tying for sixth place in the Big Ten. Purdue played home games at Ross–Ade Stadium in West Lafayette, Indiana.

Schedule

Roster

Starters

Offense: QB Mark Herrmann, TB Mike Brown/Robert Williams, FB John Skibinski, SE Reggie Arnold, FL Ray Smith, TE Dave Young/Tim Eubank, LT Mike Barberich, LG John Fincuan/Dale Schwan, C Pete Quinn/Steve Schlundt, RG Steve McKenzie, RT John LeFeber
Defense: LDE Lee Larkins, LDT Marcus Jackson/Calvin Clark, NG Roger Ruwe, RDT Jeff Senica, RDE Keena Turner, LB Fred Arrington/Kevin Motts, CB Jerome King/Pat Harris, S Willie Harris/Paul Beery/Rock Supan
Special teams: K Scott Sovereen, P Dave Eagin

Staff
Head coach: Jim Young

Assistants: Bob Bockrath, Leon Burtnett, Mike Hankwitz, Randy Hart, John Mackovic, Doug Redmann, Larry Thompson, Ed Zaunbrecher

Game summaries

Michigan State
 Ray Smith 6 receptions, 108 yards
 Reggie Arnold 7 receptions, 107 yards
 Mark Herrmann's first start at quarterback

Ohio
 Mark Herrmann 23/36 passing, 339 yards

Notre Dame
 Mark Herrmann 24/51 passing, 351 yards

Northwestern

Statistics

Passing

Rushing

Receiving

Awards
All-Big Ten
Reggie Arnold (1st)
Mark Herrmann (2nd)
John Skibinski (2nd)

References

Purdue
Purdue Boilermakers football seasons
Purdue Boilermakers football